Rewi is a Māori-language given name and surname.

People with the name include:

Given name 
 Rewi Alley (1897–1987), New Zealand-born writer and political activist in China
 Rewi Braithwaite (1897–1987), New Zealand footballer
 Rewi Maniapoto (1807–1894), Ngāti Maniapoto chief and rebel leader during the New Zealand Wars

Surname 
 Poia Rewi, New Zealand Māori academic

Māori-language surnames